Johannes Heinrich Justus Carl Ernst Brauns (21 March 1857 – 3 February 1929), more known as Hans Brauns, was a German physician and entomologist.

Born in Vlotho, Germany, Brauns qualified as Doctor of Medicine in 1894 at the University of Leipzig. He moved to South Africa in 1895, where he practiced medicine and collected insects whenever possible. Most of his entomological research focused on insects of the order Hymenoptera.

References 

20th-century German zoologists
1857 births
1929 deaths
20th-century German physicians
German emigrants to South Africa